Anmol Malik, also known by her pen name Audrey Piano, is an Indian author, singer, lyricist and composer who works in the Bollywood music industry. She is the daughter of singer Anu Malik.

Career

Early career 
After graduating from the University of Warwick, Malik returned to India and worked in the Creative Development department at Disney UTV. Following a stint as an assistant director with Rohan Sippy, Malik went on to become a junior copywriter with Leo Burnett Worldwide in India and worked on the Tide (brand) campaign for the South Asian market. She eventually became Head of the Script Department at Yash Raj Films and worked on films such as Mardaani and Dum Laga Ke Haisha.

Author
In 2020, Malik made her debut as an author with the book Three Impossible Wishes published by HarperCollins. A young-adult romantic comedy, the book was praised by actor Ayushmann Khurrana for being "Totally cheeky, completely hilarious and endlessly charming." According to a positive review by Scroll.In, the book is "A breezy campus romance that is a reminder of a life that college students are missing in the lockdown."

Under her pen name she has written several pieces of micro-fiction for Terribly Tiny Tales, a popular storytelling platform with over 12 million readers. In 2019, she was invited to write two pieces of short fiction for their third book titled With Love released by Penguin Books.

After making it to the Amazon Best Reads list Malik was chosen to write for the Amazon Kindle platform where she produced the pieces titled Audrey & Adam and Things You Learn in a Different City.
For Bound India's Jotted platform, Malik wrote The Visitor, an excerpt from a longer piece of work that has piqued the interest of fans. She was also a guest on their podcast Books And Beyond for the episode "Writing Genre-Bending Romantic Comedies".She has also written for several publications including Harper's Bazaar Alone Together,  Mansworld, In Defence Of 'I'm Too Busy''' and Elle India 

In November, she was invited to speak at the Chandigarh Literature Festival for a session titled Impossible Secrets: Coming of Age Stories For Young Adults.

 Bibliography 

Singer
Malik began her singing career by lending her voice for the movie Biwi No.1. She went on to record her first vocal track at the age of five. This was followed by other movies where Malik sang as a child artist, such as Mela and Badal.

In the year 2006, director J. P. Dutta cast her as the singer for lead actress Aishwariya Rai in the movie Umrao Jaan. Her next release was the song "Chal Mera Hath Pakad Le" from the Satish Kaushik movie Teree Sang. During the film's pre-release the song gained popularity after Malik's impromptu live performance on the music reality show Indian Idol.

At the age of 16, Malik sang "Talli" from the movie Ugly Aur Pagli, a fusion of grunge and rap music. The song debuted at the No.1 position and remained the top dance song for that year.

Malik's discography includes various popular songs such as "Suno Suno" from Gali Gali Chor Hai, "Big Fat Indian Wedding" from the movie Yeh Jo Mohabbat Hai, "Ek Mulaqat" from the movie Sonali Cable. She also sang the Western Version of "Old School Girl" from the movie Tanu Weds Manu: Returns in 2015. Recently Malik sang "Time Lagaya Kaiko" in Welcome Back.

In October 2015, her first indie single as a singer, "Lamhein", an official adaptation of Coldplay's "Paradise", was released under EMI Records India. The music was recreated by her father, Anu Malik, and the lyrics were written by Manoj Muntashir. A music video, directed by Mohit Suri, featured Malik and Mohit Marwah.

Malik launched her first English single "Let Me Come Home" in February 2017; the song is written, composed and sung by her. Malik put the song on YouTube first, where it grabbed the attention of the programming execs at VH1.

She was one of the composers for the 2017 Hindi-language Indu Sarkar.

In 2021, she was chosen to sing Chura Ke Dil Mera 2.0'' from the movie Hungama 2. It became the highest ranked dance track of the year.

Songwriter
After her graduation from university, Malik released the English single "The Graduation". The song was only released online.

Discography

References

External links

Living people
Indian women playback singers
Bollywood playback singers
Indian women singer-songwriters
Indian singer-songwriters
Singers from Mumbai
21st-century Indian singers
Women musicians from Maharashtra
21st-century Indian women singers
Year of birth missing (living people)
21st-century pseudonymous writers
Pseudonymous women writers